The 2022 FIM Endurance World Championship (FIM EWC) was the 43rd season of the FIM Endurance World Championship, a motorcycle racing series co-organised by the Fédération Internationale de Motocyclisme (FIM) and Warner Bros. Discovery's Discovery Sports Events.  The 2022 season featured four rounds, starting with the 45th 24 Heures Motos at Le Mans, followed by the return of Circuit de Spa-Francorchamps for the 24H SPA EWC Motos, the Suzuka 8 Hours in Japan and the 100th anniversary Bol d'Or at Circuit Paul Ricard in France.

Calendar

Teams and riders

Results and Standings

Race Results

Championship standings
Points systems

FIM EWC World Championship Team Rankings

FIM EWC World Championship Manufacturer's Rankings

References

External links
 Official website
 Official website at FIM

2022
FIM EWC